The Saturn Ion is a compact car sold by Saturn between the 2003 and 2007 model years. It used the GM Delta platform. The Ion replaced the Saturn S-Series in 2002,
and was replaced by the new Saturn Astra in 2008. Production of the Ion ended on March 29, 2007. The Ion was the last Saturn passenger car built at the Spring Hill, Tennessee plant which was originally linked to the company's branding, with Saturn owners attending "homecoming" events at the plant.

Trim levels 

The Saturn Ion was offered in three trim "Levels": Level 1, Level 2, and Level 3, as well as a "Red Line" trim (in later model years).

The Level 1 trim, only offered as a four-door sedan, was the entry-level Ion trim. It included features such as cloth seating surfaces, 14" tires and steel wheels with plastic wheel covers, manual windows and door locks, an AM/FM stereo radio with a four-speaker audio system, a heater (no standard air conditioning), a 2.2L dual overhead cam (DOHC) inline four-cylinder (I4) gasoline engine, and a five-speed manual transmission. The Level 1 trim was discontinued in later model years of the Ion.

The Level 2 trim was the entry-level Quad Coupe trim, and the upgraded trim for the four-door sedan. It included features such as upgraded 15" tires and steel wheels and plastic wheel covers, air conditioning, and an AM/FM stereo with a single-disc CD player (which also included an auxiliary audio input jack in later model years).

The Level 3 was the top-of-the-line trim for both the Quad Coupe and the four-door sedan. It added more convenience items such as power windows and door locks, keyless entry, 16" tires and aluminum-alloy wheels, upgraded cloth seating surfaces, and an AM/FM stereo with both cassette and single-disc CD players (later, an AM/FM stereo with satellite option, a single-disc CD/MP3 player, and an auxiliary audio input jack).

The Red Line was the performance-oriented trim of the Ion, only available as a Quad Coupe. It featured a 2.0L supercharged I4 gasoline engine, a unique body kit and front grille, unique aluminum-alloy wheels, unique cloth seating surfaces, and a rear spoiler.

History

2003–2004

The 2003 Saturn Ion quad coupe production car first appeared at the 2002 New York International Auto Show. The 2003 Ion came standard with a 2.2 L  DOHC Ecotec I4 engine. The Ion sedan went on sale in mid-October 2002, and the quad coupe went on sale in early 2003. The Ion's instrument panel was mounted on the top center of the dashboard, rather than behind the steering wheel. The Ion is also available in sedan level 1, 2, or 3; level three signified a more user friendly setup with power windows and power locks, while lower levels included crank windows and plastic wheel covers. Other extras included fog lights, sunroof, and spoiler. The Saturn Ion Quad Coupe has half-sized rear clamshell doors while the sedan has conventionally hinged doors.

A Getrag F23 5-speed manual or an Aisin AF23 5-speed automatic transmission were available. The compact 5-speed automatic had several unique characteristics. The transmission lacked an overdrive, allowing for five forward gears to be packaged in the size of a typical four-speed manual gearbox, both providing close gear ratios for better acceleration and fuel efficiency while eliminating the heat and parasitic loss generated by the additional planetary gearset. The unit was also "fill-for-life," meaning that it was not intended to be serviced for the life of the vehicle. The 2003 and 2004 Ion Coupes were available with the VTi continuously variable transmission or a Getrag F23 5-speed manual.

For 2004, Saturn also re-calibrated the electric power steering, as well as upgraded interior materials, and offered new sound systems.

2005–2006

In 2005, the Aisin 5-speed automatic transmission was discontinued. The VTi CVT used in the quad-coupes between 2002 and 2004 was also discontinued. GM's 4-speed 4T45-E replaced both transmissions, becoming the only available automatic transmission option. The 2005 Ion sedan models also received a new steering wheel, the same one used in the 2004 Ion coupe models. In the middle of the 2005 model year, the seats in the base Ion1 model received upgraded fabrics and a height adjustment feature. "Quiet Steel" multilaminate sound-reduction technology was also introduced in 2005. Cosmetic changes included an upgraded fascia with a larger grille opening (2005-2007 Ion sedan models) and redesigned wheel covers and redesigned alloy wheel offerings. Under the hood, an acoustic engine cover was added to the engine bay to reduce noise emissions.

The Level 2 and Level 3 models were offered with GM's new standard radio, featuring MP3 playback.

The Ion went on to be discontinued after the 2007 model year.

2007

The new engine was fitted with the ECU from the 2.4-liter engine.

An "Appearance Package" was offered for the 2007 Ion 3 Quad Coupe, including redesigned front and rear bumpers, side moldings, elliptical fog lamps, and a chrome exhaust tip. The Recaro seats in the Red Line version were replaced with black leather-appointed seats, which featured a passenger-sensing system.

The Ion was discontinued after the 2007 model year, and replaced in Saturn's lineup by the Saturn Astra hatchback, a rebadged Opel Astra H imported from Belgium.

The 2007 Ion was the last Saturn built at the Spring Hill, Tennessee plant.

Red Line Edition 
In production from 2004 through the 2007 Model Year, Saturn produced the Red Line Sport Compact This engine/powertrain combination is also shared with the Chevy Cobalt SS Supercharged Edition, which did not start production until the 2005 model year. The Ion Red Line features most interior features from the standard Ion Coupe, including its rear clamshell doors, to allow accessibility to the rear seat.

Introduced for the 2005 model year was the optional Competition Package. Included in the Competition Package were 17" Gunmetal Painted Alloy Rims, Ladder Tachometer w/ shift lights, a Limited Slip Differential, and Optional Projector-beam Fog Lamps. In mid-2006, GM released two Engine Kit upgrades for both the Ion Red Line and the Cobalt SS. The Stage 2 Kit retailed for around $750 and opens up the middle of the power curve to more power than the Stage 1 Kit alone. GM did release a Stage 1 to Stage 2 Upgrade kit that retailed for $400. This Upgrade Kit is for a Red Line with the Stage 1 kit already installed.

On October 17, 2003 at the Bonneville Salt Flats in Utah, the Saturn Ion Red Line, piloted by the GM Performance Division's "Saturn Land Speed Record Project" set a new land-speed record in the "G/Blown Fuel Altered" Class at 212.684 mph. This exceeded the previous record of 183.086 mph that was set in 2001.

Below are the Production Numbers for the Ion Red Line from 2004 to 2007.

Discontinuation

General Motors decided to discontinue the Ion after the 2007 model year. It was replaced by the 2008 Astra.

The Astra shares the Delta platform with the Ion, but is a captive import from Opel. While Opel offered the Astra in multiple body types, and with other performance options, Saturn did not import any of them – the Astra was only offered with a single base engine, and in 3-door and 5-door hatchback bodystyles only, in two trim levels. The Ion was the last Saturn to have brand-specific design cues originating with the S-Series such as plastic body panels.

Safety

Insurance Institute for Highway Safety (IIHS)

IIHS only tested the 4-door sedan version. It did not test coupe versions of the Ion.

NHTSA

Recall
In February 2014, the Ion was added to a list of General Motors cars recalled due to a faulty ignition switch. 13 deaths were found to have been caused by the defect in Chevrolet Cobalt models, prompting the recall of the Ion and other related GM vehicles.

References

External links

C&G Spy Shots: Ion replaced by Astra
Saturn Ion Redline Forums
Saturn ION Quad Coupe 2.2i Specifications & pictures

Compact cars
Front-wheel-drive vehicles
Ion
Vehicles with CVT transmission
Coupés
Sedans
Cars introduced in 2002
Motor vehicles manufactured in the United States